Marcelo Quiñonez (born March 24, 1949 in Surquillo) is a Peruvian former professional boxer who competed from 1971 to 1983. He was one of South America's top ranked middleweights during the 1970s. He also represented Peru at the 1968 Summer Olympics.

Professional career
Quiñones began his professional career as a boxer on September 27, 1971.  In his debut Quiñones defeated Carlos Bazán by knockout in Lima.

He added the South American middleweight title with a knockout in twelve rounds victory over Luiz Fabre, on August 9, 1976 in Lima.

Over his professional career Quiñones won 31 bouts, losing 8 and drawing 1, with 18 wins coming via knockout.

Professional boxing record

|-
|align="center" colspan=8|32 Wins (18 knockouts, 14 decisions), 8 Losses (4 knockouts, 4 decisions), 1 Draw 
|-
| align="center" style="border-style: none none solid solid; background: #e3e3e3"|Result
| align="center" style="border-style: none none solid solid; background: #e3e3e3"|Record
| align="center" style="border-style: none none solid solid; background: #e3e3e3"|Opponent
| align="center" style="border-style: none none solid solid; background: #e3e3e3"|Type
| align="center" style="border-style: none none solid solid; background: #e3e3e3"|Round
| align="center" style="border-style: none none solid solid; background: #e3e3e3"|Date
| align="center" style="border-style: none none solid solid; background: #e3e3e3"|Location
| align="center" style="border-style: none none solid solid; background: #e3e3e3"|Notes
|-align=center
|Loss
|
|align=left| Néstor Flores
|KO
|3
|16/12/1983
|align=left| Guayaquil, Ecuador
|align=left|
|-
|Win
|
|align=left| Juan Guzmán
|PTS
|10
|09/10/1982
|align=left| Huánuco, Peru

|align=left|
|-
|Loss
|
|align=left| Jacinto Horácio Fernández
|RTD
|8
|14/03/1980
|align=left| San Justo, Argentina
|align=left|
|-
|Win
|
|align=left| Johnny Heard
|UD
|10
|09/11/1979
|align=left| Trujillo, Peru
|align=left|
|-
|Win
|
|align=left| José Anglada
|KO
|2
|13/10/1979
|align=left| Trujillo, Peru
|align=left|
|-
|Loss
|
|align=left| Johnny Heard
|TKO
|9
|08/06/1979
|align=left| Lima, Peru
|align=left|
|-
|Win
|
|align=left| Mario Martiliano
|UD
|10
|30/03/1979
|align=left| Lima, Peru
|align=left|
|-
|Draw
|
|align=left| Jacinto Horácio Fernández
|TD
|2
|13/10/1978
|align=left| Buenos Aires, Argentina
|align=left|
|-
|Loss
|
|align=left| José María Flores Burlón
|PTS
|12
|12/08/1978
|align=left| Montevideo, Uruguay
|align=left|
|-
|Loss
|
|align=left| Jacinto Horácio Fernández
|PTS
|10
|10/06/1978
|align=left| Santa Fe, Argentina
|align=left|
|-
|Loss
|
|align=left| Tony Chiaverini
|KO
|3
|15/02/1978
|align=left| Las Vegas, Nevada, U.S.
|align=left|
|-
|Win
|
|align=left| Larry Davis
|UD
|10
|14/10/1977
|align=left| Lima, Peru
|align=left|
|-
|Win
|
|align=left| Pablo Alberto Ferreyra
|PTS
|10
|09/09/1977
|align=left| Lima, Peru
|align=left|
|-
|Loss
|
|align=left| Hugo Corro
|SD
|12
|09/05/1977
|align=left| Lima, Peru
|align=left|
|-
|Win
|
|align=left| Juárez De Lima
|KO
|10
|01/04/1977
|align=left| Lima, Peru
|align=left|
|-
|Win
|
|align=left| Carlos Marks
|UD
|10
|22/10/1976
|align=left| Lima, Peru
|align=left|
|-
|Win
|
|align=left| Luiz Carlos Fabre
|TKO
|10
|09/08/1976
|align=left| Lima, Peru
|align=left|
|-
|Win
|
|align=left| Manuel Fierro
|KO
|8
|21/05/1976
|align=left| Lima, Peru
|align=left|
|-
|Win
|
|align=left| Luis Vinales
|TKO
|5
|14/02/1976
|align=left| Panama City, Panama
|align=left|
|-
|Win
|
|align=left| Thurman Holliday
|KO
|9
|19/12/1975
|align=left| Lima, Peru
|align=left|
|-
|Win
|
|align=left| Roy Dale
|PTS
|10
|26/11/1975
|align=left| Lima, Peru
|align=left|
|-
|Win
|
|align=left| Rodolfo Rosales
|KO
|7
|17/10/1975
|align=left| Lima, Peru
|align=left|
|-
|Win
|
|align=left| Alipio Colli
|TKO
|4
|31/08/1975
|align=left| Lima, Peru
|align=left|
|-
|Win
|
|align=left| Sammy Barr
|TKO
|4
|04/07/1975
|align=left| Trujillo, Peru
|align=left|
|-
|Win
|
|align=left| José Fellotti
|TKO
|4
|19/05/1975
|align=left| Lima, Peru
|align=left|
|-
|Win
|
|align=left| Dino Del Cid
|KO
|8
|25/04/1975
|align=left| Lima, Peru
|align=left|
|-
|Win
|
|align=left| Daniel Nicolas Quiroga
|KO
|3
|31/03/1975
|align=left| Lima, Peru
|align=left|
|-
|Win
|
|align=left| Luis Bidela
|PTS
|10
|15/11/1974
|align=left| Lima, Peru
|align=left|
|-
|Win
|
|align=left|Orlando Assumpcão
|KO
|3
|23/02/1974
|align=left| Lima, Peru
|align=left|
|-
|Win
|
|align=left| Ruben Martínez
|PTS
|10
|12/12/1973
|align=left| Arequipa, Peru
|align=left|
|-
|Win
|
|align=left| Orlando Maximo Nasul
|PTS
|10
|05/10/1973
|align=left| Lima, Peru
|align=left|
|-
|Win
|
|align=left| Domingo Guerrero
|TKO
|1
|07/07/1973
|align=left| Lima, Peru
|align=left|
|-
|Loss
|
|align=left| Rodolfo Rosales
|PTS
|10
|19/05/1973
|align=left| Buenos Aires, Argentina
|align=left|
|-
|Win
|
|align=left| Daniel Nicolas Quiroga
|PTS
|10
|07/10/1972
|align=left| Lima, Peru
|align=left|
|-
|Win
|
|align=left| Faustino Galdame
|KO
|7
|15/07/1972
|align=left| Mendoza, Argentina
|align=left|
|-
|Win
|
|align=left| Daniel Nicolas Quiroga
|PTS
|10
|02/06/1972
|align=left| Mendoza, Argentina
|align=left|
|-
|Win
|
|align=left| Luis Mora
|PTS
|8
|21/01/1972
|align=left| Lima, Peru
|align=left|
|-
|Win
|
|align=left| Roman Aburto
|KO
|1
|10/12/1971
|align=left| Lima, Peru
|align=left|
|-
|Win
|
|align=left| Marcos Tordoya
|PTS
|6
|19/11/1971
|align=left| Lima, Peru
|align=left|
|-
|Win
|
|align=left|Francisco Latapiat
|KO
|1
|29/10/1971
|align=left| Lima, Peru
|align=left|
|-
|Win
|
|align=left| Carlos Bazan
|KO
|1
|27/09/1971
|align=left| Lima, Peru
|align=left|
|}

References

External links
 

1949 births
Living people
Middleweight boxers
Peruvian male boxers
Olympic boxers of Peru
Boxers at the 1968 Summer Olympics
20th-century Peruvian people
21st-century Peruvian people